Spire Inc. is a public utility holding company based in St. Louis, Missouri, providing natural gas service through its regulated core utility operations while engaging in non-regulated activities that provide business opportunities. Its primary subsidiary Laclede Gas Company is the largest natural gas distribution utility in Missouri, serving approximately 631,000 residential, commercial and industrial customers in the City of St. Louis and ten counties in eastern Missouri.  Its corporate headquarters is located in the 700 Market building in downtown St. Louis.

On April 29, 2016, the company began trading on the New York Stock Exchange under the symbol SR.  It had previously been known as the Laclede Group, trading under the symbol LG.

History

Laclede Gas Company was one of the original 12 industrial companies that made up the Dow Jones Industrial Average but was removed in 1899. On December 7, 2009, executives from The Laclede Group visited the New York Stock Exchange (NYSE) to ring the closing bell and commemorate the company’s 120th anniversary of trading on the exchange. The Company first listed its stock on November 14, 1889, making it the 8th-oldest listed stock on the NYSE.

On February 1, 2012, Laclede hired its first female CEO, Suzanne Sitherwood. Sitherwood earned a bachelor of science degree in industrial engineering technology from the Southern College of Technology and an MBA from Brenau University.

In 2013, The Laclede Group acquired Missouri Gas Energy from Southern Union Company, expanding their Missouri holdings to include Kansas City.

In 2014 Laclede acquired Alabama Gas Corporation (Alagasco), which serves the Greater Birmingham, East Lauderdale County, Gadsden, Jasper, Anniston-Oxford, Greater Tuscaloosa, Greater Montgomery, Opelika-Auburn, Tuskegee, Selma, and many Black Belt communities as Spire Alabama Inc.

On April 28, 2016, The Laclede Group shareholders approved renaming the company to Spire.  Later in 2016, Spire acquired Energy South, Inc from Sempra U.S. Gas & Power, the parent company of Mobile Gas and Willmut Gas.  Mobile Gas operates in Mobile, Alabama as Spire Gulf Coast Inc. while Willmut gas operates in Hattiesburg, Mississippi as Spire Mississippi Inc..

See also
 Laclede Gas Company - Subsidiary of the Laclede Group
 Laclede Gas Building

References

External links
 The Laclede Group, Inc.
 OriginalGreenEnergy

Energy companies of the United States
Holding companies of the United States
Natural gas companies of the United States
Oil companies of the United States
Companies based in St. Louis
Energy infrastructure in Missouri
Energy companies established in 2016
Holding companies established in 2016
Non-renewable resource companies established in 2016
2016 establishments in Missouri
Companies listed on the New York Stock Exchange
Companies based in Missouri